The New Zealand cricket team and the Pakistan cricket team played a three-match One Day International series and two Twenty20 Internationals from 3 November 2009 to 13 November 2009 in the UAE. The one-day matches were played in Sheikh Zayed Cricket Stadium, Abu Dhabi while the Twenty20s were played in Dubai Sports City Cricket Stadium. The series was originally scheduled to be held in Pakistan but due to security concerns, it was shifted to UAE although Pakistan still remained the home team.

ODI series

1st ODI

2nd ODI

3rd ODI

T20I Series

1st T20I

2nd T20I

Media coverage

Television
Ten Sports (live) – South Asia, Middle East and Pakistan
Supersport (live) – South Africa
Asian Television Network (live) – Canada

References

External links
 Pakistan v New Zealand 2009/10 (cricinfo)

2009 in New Zealand cricket
2009 in Pakistani cricket
2009 in Emirati cricket
Cricket in the United Arab Emirates
International cricket competitions in 2009–10
2009-10
Pakistani cricket seasons from 2000–01